Nakhoda is a genus of mites in the family Laelapidae.

Species
 Nakhoda linearis Domrow & Nadchatram, 1975

References

Laelapidae